Flu is an infectious disease of birds and mammals caused by RNA viruses of the family Orthomyxoviridae, the influenza viruses.

Flu or FLU may also refer to:

Diseases

Influenza
 Influenza virus, the viruses that cause the disease

 Avian flu, influenza caused by viruses adapted to birds
 Dog flu, influenza occurring in canine animals
 Equine flu, influenza caused by viruses endemic in horses
 Human flu, influenza caused by viruses endemic in human populations
 Swine flu, influenza caused by viruses endemic in pigs

 Influenza A virus subtype H5N1, a strain of avian influenza

Other diseases
 Flu-like illness, illness similar to flu, mistaken for flu, called flu
 Cat flu, the common name for a feline upper respiratory tract disease
 Haemophilus influenzae, or H. flu, a bacterial infection which can cause respiratory infections and sepsis
 Influenza-like illness, a medical diagnosis of possible influenza or other illness causing a set of common symptoms
 Stomach flu, also known as gastroenteritis

People
 Fluent Form, Australian rapper also known as Flu

Places
 Flushing Airport (IATA airport code: FLU; ICAO airport code: KFLU), Queens, New York City, New York State, USA

Art, entertainment, and media
 Flu Press, an imprint of VDM Publishing devoted to the reproduction of Wikipedia content
 Flu (film), a 2013 South Korean film
 "The Flu" (The Golden Girls), a 1986 television episode
 "The Flu" (Parks and Recreation), or "Flu Season", a 2011 television episode

Other uses
 FLU (plant gene), a mutation that causes plants to glow red in presence of blue light
 Federation of Hong Kong and Kowloon Labour Unions (FLU or HKFLU), a labour federation and political party
 Man flu, a pejorative term meaning men exaggerate cold symptoms
 Foreningen af Lokalunioner i Danmark (FLU), the old name for the organization of Danish regional football associations.

See also

 Flew (disambiguation)
 Flue, a duct, pipe, or opening in a chimney for conveying exhaust gases
 
 
 Influenza (disambiguation)
 Grippe (disambiguation)
 ful (disambiguation)
 UFL (disambiguation)
 ULF (disambiguation)
 LUF (disambiguation)
 LFU (disambiguation)